Pleiostachya is a genus of plants in the  Marantaceae family native to Mexico, Central America, Colombia, and Ecuador. It contains 3 recognized species:

Pleiostachya leiostachya (Donn.Sm.) Hammel, Phytologia 60: 16 (1986).- Costa Rica, Panamá
Pleiostachya pittieri Rowlee ex Standl., J. Wash. Acad. Sci. 15: 5 (1925). - Colombia, Panamá
Pleiostachya pruinosa (Regel) K.Schum. in H.G.A.Engler (ed.), Das Pflanzenreich IV, 48: 165 (1902). - Mexico, Central America, Colombia, Ecuador

References

Marantaceae
Zingiberales genera